Bajva railway station is a railway station in Bajva town of Vadodara district of Gujarat, India. Its code is BJW. It is the rail head for the Gujarat Refinery for petrol and diesel. Bajva is also the loading point of fertilizers from Gujarat State Fertilizers and Chemicals. Passenger, MEMU and Intercity trains halt here.

Major trains

Following major train halt at Bajva railway station in both direction:

 19035/36 Vadodara–Ahmedabad Intercity Express

References

Railway stations in Vadodara district
Vadodara railway division
Year of establishment missing